Underwood Island is a small lake island in Wangumbaug Lake in Coventry, Connecticut. It is about two acres in size, only one quarter of which is privately owned. That part is currently for sale. The island has a pond on it, and was named for both its condition and the legend that it was visited by the owner of Underwood Typewriter Co. and his wife. It is 100 yards from the coast of the lake.

References

Islands of Connecticut
Coventry, Connecticut
Landforms of Tolland County, Connecticut